"Second Heartbeat" is a song by Avenged Sevenfold, and is the seventh track on their second album, Waking the Fallen.

Background
An early version "Second Heartbeat" was recorded in 2002, and appeared on the compilation "Hopelessly Devoted To You Vol. 4". This early version was shorter and faster. The band showed this version of the song to producer Mudrock to convince him to produce their second album, which he would end up doing. It was later included on the 2014 Waking the Fallen: Resurrected reissue.

Live
"Second Heartbeat" is the 20th most performed Avenged Sevenfold song live. The song made its live debut during the tour for the bands first album, Sounding the Seventh Trumpet, in 2002. In the band's early career, it was a live staple. While not being played often anymore, it is brought back every now and then.

Critical reception
"Second Heartbeat" is widely regarded as one of the band's best songs. In 2020, Louder Sound and Kerrang ranked the song at number two and number ten, respectively, on their lists of the 20 greatest Avenged Sevenfold songs. Return of Rock also ranked it as the best song from its parent album.

Personnel
Credits are adapted from the album's liner notes.

Avenged Sevenfold

 M. Shadows – lead vocals
 Zacky Vengeance – guitars, backing vocals
 The Rev – drums, percussion, backing vocals
 Synyster Gates – guitars, piano, backing vocals
 Johnny Christ – bass guitar, backing vocals

Production
 Andrew Murdock – producer, mixing engineer
 Fred Archambault – co-producer
 Ai Fujisaki – assistant engineer
 Tom Baker – mastering engineer
 Mike Fasano, Bruce Jacoby, Al Pahanish – drum tech
 Stephen Ferrara – guitar tech
 Scott Gilman – orchestral arrangements and performance

References

2003 songs
Avenged Sevenfold songs
Melodic death metal songs